The Ospenke is a left tributary of the Söse near Osterode in the Harz Mountains of central Germany in the state of Lower Saxony.

Course 
The Ospenke rises between the valleys of the Apenke and Eipenke, runs parallel to the latter and empties from the left into the Söse in the suburb of Scheerenberg.

See also 
List of rivers of Lower Saxony

References 

Rivers of Lower Saxony
Rivers of the Harz
Göttingen (district)
Rivers of Germany